Hanasaari (Swedish: Hanaholmen) is a neighbourhood in the district of Sörnäinen in Helsinki, Finland, between the neighbourhoods of Vilhonvuori, Kalasatama and Sompasaari near Merihaka. The name comes from an island that was lost under reclaimed land. Hanasaari is primarily a power plant area. The first power plant was built next to Hanasaari in Suvilahti.

History

Etymology
The name of the island first appeared in a 1639 map of Helsinki as Haneholmen, where the word hane meant rooster. The name came from the smaller island named Hönan ("the hen"), thus the names of the two islands formed a pair, which is typical in island names. In 1909 the Swedish and Finnish names Hanaholmen - Hanaholma were in use. The current name Hanasaari was made official in 1928, but it had already been in use since the 1880s.

Power plant

Building the A plant of the Hanasaari Power Plant started in 1957 and it was completed in 1960. The A plant was in use until 2000 and since that as a backup plant. A decision to dismantle the A plant was made in 2006. Planning the B plant started in 1962, and it started operating in 1974. There have been plans for residential building in the area, which will require cleansing the soil, as cyanide was found in the soil near the red-brick B plant in 2006. Cleansing the groundwater in the area is expensive and difficult, and can take decades to fully complete.

As a residential area
The power plant is scheduled to stop operating in spring 2023. There will be a new residential area in Hanasaari in the 2030s.

References

External links
 
 Hanasaari Power Plant, Helen. Accessed on 27 November 2020.
 Pelasta Hanasaari. Accessed on 20 May 2007.
 "Hanasaari A: Ruma on kaunista". Voima 8 May 2007. Accessed on 27 November 2020.

Sörnäinen
Former islands